The Commander of the Israeli Air Force is the head and highest-ranking officer of the Israeli Air Force, and has operational control and is responsible for overall operations of the air force. The current Commander Tomer Bar.

List of officeholders

See also
 Commander of the Navy (Israel)

References

Israeli Air Force
Israel